Brindha Sivakumar (born c. 1980) is an Indian singer and voice artist who works in Tamil-language films. She is the daughter of actor Sivakumar and the younger sister of actors Suriya and Karthi.

Career 
While Brindha was studying grade 10, Karthik Raja called her for a recording, but Brindha declined the offer since her board exams were near. She made her debut as a playback singer with Mr. Chandramouli (2018). Brindha sang the title track for the film. She was called to sing a song for the film after Dhananjayan, a family friend and the film's producer, listened to her voice while she was singing a prayer song for Agaram Foundation. She went on to sing a song in Raatchasi (2019). In a review of the soundtrack by The Times of India, the reviewer wrote that "The second song, Nee Yen Nanbanae, is ... a soothing melody sung by Brindha Sivakumar". Her next song was in the film Jackpot (2019) and a critic from The Times of India stated that "Sinduri Vishal and Brindha Sivakumar have gone full throttle to bring out the energy in the nout letting the tempo slip even a wee bit".

Personal life 
Brindha's father, Sivakumar; brothers, Suriya and Karthi; and sister-in-law, Jyothika; are all actors who work in the Tamil film industry. In 2005, Brindha married a granite industrialist who shares the same name as her father, Sivakumar. They have a son and daughter.

Discography

Voice artist

References

External links 

Tamil playback singers
Living people

1980 births
Year of birth uncertain